ABC South Coast is an ABC Local Radio station based in Albany broadcasting to the coastal parts of the Great Southern region of Western Australia including the towns of Denmark, and Mount Barker.

Although planned in 1951 the station began broadcasting as 6AL in 1956. There are a number of low power FM transmitters as well.  Local programs are also broadcast through ABC Great Southern.

When local programs are not being broadcast, the station is a relay of 720 ABC Perth.

References

See also
 List of radio stations in Australia

South Coast
Radio stations in Western Australia
Mass media in Albany, Western Australia